William Clothier defeated defending champion Beals Wright in the Challenge Round 6–3, 6–0, 6–4 to win the men's singles tennis title at the 1906 U.S. National Championships. Clothier had defeated Karl Behr in the All Comers' Final.

The event was held at the Newport Casino in Newport, R.I. in the United States.

Draw

Challenge round

All Comers' finals

Earlier rounds

Section 1

Section 2

Section 3

Section 4

Section 5

Section 6

Section 7

Section 8

References
 

Men's Singles
1906